Dan Boye is an American North American champion bridge player and an American Contract Bridge League (ACBL) Grand Life Master.

Bridge accomplishments

Wins
 North American Bridge Championships (1)
 Truscott Senior Swiss Teams (1) 2022

Personal life
Dan was married to Sue, who passed away in March 2017. They have one son and one daughter.

References

American contract bridge players
Living people
1951 births